Earl Louis Brown (July 24, 1900 – April 13, 1980) was an American Negro league pitcher, journalist, and politician.

A native of Charlottesville, Virginia, Brown attended Harvard University, where he was a star pitcher for the Crimson. He graduated from Harvard in 1924, and that summer played briefly for the Lincoln Giants of the Eastern Colored League. He went on to teach economics and government at Virginia Union University and Louisville Municipal College before turning to a career in journalism. A reporter and editor at Life, and later managing editor of the New York Amsterdam News, Brown was elected to the New York City Council in 1949, and served there until 1961. In 1958, he lost a bid to unseat incumbent U.S. Representative Adam Clayton Powell Jr. Brown later became chairman of New York City's Commission on Human Rights. He died in New York, New York in 1980 at age 79.

References

External links
 and Seamheads

1900 births
1980 deaths
African-American journalists
Lincoln Giants players
New York City Council members
Harvard Crimson baseball players
Virginia Union University faculty
Baseball pitchers
People from Charlottesville, Virginia
Editors of New York City newspapers
American magazine editors
20th-century African-American sportspeople